Mannion is a surname of Irish origin. Notable people with the surname include:

 Frank Mannion, Irish film producer
 Georgia Mannion (born 2003), Australian singer-songwriter known professionally as George Alice
 John Mannion Jnr (1944–2006), Irish politician
 Jonathan Mannion (born 1970), photographer and director
 Karol Mannion, Irish gaelic football player
 Nico Mannion (born 2001), Italian-American basketball player
 Pace Mannion (born 1960), American basketball player
 Paul Mannion (born 1993), Irish gaelic football player
 Teresa Mannion, Irish journalist and broadcaster
 Wes Mannion (born 1970), director of Australia Zoo
 Wilf Mannion (1918–2000), English football player
 John Mannion (born 1968), American politician

Fictional characters
 Chief Jack Mannion, fictional Irish-American in the television show The District
 Peter Mannion, a fictional MP in the British television series The Thick of It
 Nursing Sister Shelagh Turner (née Mannion), previously known by her religious name of Sister Bernadette, is a fictional Scottish midwife, medical secretary and nursing sister of Nonnatus House in the television show Call the Midwife
 Sir Christopher Mannion, a fictional magistrate in the novel The Leviathan by Rosie Andrews.

See also
 Manion
 James Mannon, American sociologist